Kjell Karlsson (born 20 June 1953) is a Swedish former footballer who played as a defender. He made 84 Allsvenskan appearances for Djurgårdens IF and scored 18 goals.

References

Swedish footballers
Djurgårdens IF Fotboll players
1953 births
Living people
Place of birth missing (living people)

Association football defenders